Beyond This Place is a 2010 documentary film directed by Kaleo La Belle, screened at a number of film festivals.  In it, La Belle reunites with his biological father Cloud Rock La Belle, a charismatic figure who was largely absent from his life.  The film deals, in a personal and intimate way, with issues of parenting, issues of freedom versus responsibility, and with the aging of the 60's generation.

The film won an award for Best Documentary over 60 minutes at the 2010 Krakow Film Festival and the "Prix création" award at the 2010 Visions du Réel film festival.

The score of the film was written by Sufjan Stevens and Raymond Raposa. The film was screened with a live musical performance by the two musicians in the fall of 2011, including at the Castro Theater in San Francisco.

References

External links

Trailer

Biographical documentary films
English-language Swiss films
2010 films
2010 documentary films
Autobiographical documentary films
Swiss documentary films
Swiss biographical films
2010s English-language films